The D.C. Armory is an armory and a 10,000-seat multi-purpose arena in the eastern United States, located in Washington, D.C., east of the U.S. Capitol building.  Managed by the Washington Convention and Sports Authority, the Armory was constructed and opened  in 1941, as the headquarters, armory, and training facility for the District of Columbia National Guard. In recent years it has also become a venue for a broad range of events.  Adjacent to the northeast is RFK Stadium, which opened in 1961.

About
Prior to its construction, the Convention Hall located on 5th Street NW, between K and L had been used as an armory. Construction on the new armory began on June 2, 1940, and it opened on July 13, 1941. The structure was designed by the city's Municipal Architect, Nathan C. Wyeth. The D.C. Armory replaced the National Armory, a 1910 structure which was designed by New York City architect Electus D. Litchfield.

OPLAN 1954, a 1954 war game preparing for an atomic bomb exploding over Washington, D.C., supposed that a vacant parking lot near the Armory could be turned into an emergency airstrip for delivering medical supplies. Initially, nonmilitary use of the Armory was facilitated by the D.C. Armory Board, which was formed in 1948. During its existence the board oversaw the use of both the Armory and RFK Stadium. In 1994 the board was dissolved and the city's use of the Armory came under the authority of the D.C. Sports and Entertainment Commission (DCSEC), which later became the Washington Convention and Sports Authority.

The Armory is served by the Stadium–Armory station on the Blue, Orange, and Silver Lines of the Washington Metro. The Armory shares a 10,000 car parking lot with the adjacent Robert F. Kennedy Memorial Stadium.

Events

The Washington Diplomats played indoor soccer at the armory in 1978. The armory has hosted the WCW Capital Combat professional wrestling event in 1990, served as a preliminary tryout venue for American Idol, been a concert venue for Marilyn Manson, and hosted the Longest Yard Football Classic, a charity game pitting Members of Congress (aided by former NFL stars) against the Capitol Police. In 2007, the first sanctioned pro mixed martial arts event in Washington, D.C. was held at the armory. 

The Armory has been home to the DC Rollergirls, D.C.'s female flat track roller derby league, since February 2008. In 2009, the Armory became home to the D.C. Armor, an American Indoor Football Association team. Popular Dutch trance artist Armin van Buuren played a six-hour set at the Armory in 2011. In 2013, facility hosted the IBF Junior Welterweight title fight featuring Lamont Peterson and Kendall Holt.

During World War II, the Armory was used by the FBI Identification Division to house fingerprint records. Inauguration balls spanning from the presidencies of Harry S. Truman to Barack Obama have also been hosted at the Armory. Frank Sinatra and Peter Lawford produced President Kennedy's pre-inaugural gala at the Armory on January 19, 1961. The cast of performers included Harry Belafonte, Milton Berle, Leonard Bernstein, Joey Bishop, Nat King Cole, Tony Curtis, Jimmy Durante, Ella Fitzgerald, Gene Kelly, Alan King, Janet Leigh, Ethel Merman, Louis Prima, Keely Smith, Pat Suzuki, and Helen Traubel.

Notes

References

Bibliography

External links
WCSA official site
DC National Guard
DC Office of Tax and Revenue----Ownership

1941 establishments in Washington, D.C.
Armories in the United States
Boxing venues in Washington, D.C.
Defunct college basketball venues in the United States
Defunct indoor soccer venues in the United States
Georgetown Hoyas basketball venues
Military facilities in Washington, D.C.
Mixed martial arts venues in Washington, D.C.
North American Soccer League (1968–1984) indoor venues